Dr. Patnam Mahender Reddy is an Indian politician and Member of Legislative Council (MLC) in Telangana. He was the Transport minister of Telangana state from 2014 to 2018. He was the MLA from Tandur Constituency. He was elected as Member of Legislative council (MLC) in 2019.

Early life
Mahender Reddy was born in Golluriguda in Shabad Mandal. He is a veterinary doctor which is related to study of animals. He is the nephew of former Home Minister and MLA, P. Indra Reddy. He received a bachelor's degree in Veterinary Sciences (BVSc) from Osmania University.

Career
He is the present Member of Legislative council (MLC) in Telangana from 2019. Mahender Reddy was 4-time MLA from Tandur Assembly Constituency. He was elected as MLA to Andhra Pradesh State Legislative Assembly from Tandur assembly constituency in 1994, 1999 and 2009 and after bifurcation of the state was re-elected in 2014 to Telangana Legislative Assembly.

He was elected first in the 1994 general elections from Tandur constituency, Ranga Reddy District on Telugu Desam Party. Mahender Reddy was the Ranga Reddy district President of Telugudesam party.

TRS 
He joined TRS before the elections of 2014 without a substantial participation in the Telangana statehood formation agitation. He was the Minister for Transportation in the first Telangana government. He has lost the elections in Nov. 2018 against Pilot Rohit Reddy in Tandur constituency.

Personal life
He is married to Sunitha Reddy. She is the current Zilla Parishad Chairperson of Ranga Reddy District, her second term. His brother Patnam Narender Reddy was an MLC from erstwhile Ranga Reddy District, his second term. In Nov. 2018, Patnam Narender Reddy fought election against Revanth Reddy and won from Kodangal constituency.

Other interests
He is Chairman of Dr. Patnam Mahender Reddy Institute of Medical Sciences, Chevella.

He is the Chairman of Patnam Mahender Reddy Memorial Educational Society which consists of three engineering colleges (listed below) in and around the city of Hyderabad.

 PRRM Engineering College, Shabad, Ranga Reddy district
 Raja Mahendra College of Engineering, Ibrahimpatnam, Ranga Reddy district
 P. Indra Reddy Memorial Engineering College, Chevella, Ranga Reddy district

References

https://archive.today/20120406061943/http://www.prrm.co.in/index.html
http://www.rajamahendra.org/
https://web.archive.org/web/20120307100808/http://www.pirmec.org/index.html

Telangana politicians
People from Telangana
Telugu Desam Party politicians
Living people
Telangana MLAs 2014–2018
Telangana Rashtra Samithi politicians
State cabinet ministers of Telangana
Telugu politicians
1963 births